Schleinikon is a municipality in the district of Dielsdorf in the canton of Zürich in Switzerland.

Geography

Of this area, 49.9% is used for agricultural purposes, while 43.2% is forested. Of the rest of the land, 6.7% is settled (buildings or roads) and the remainder (0.2%) is non-productive (rivers, glaciers or mountains).

Demographics
, 5.7% of the population was made up of foreign nationals. Over the last 10 years the population has grown at a rate of 9.4%. Most of the population speaks German  (95.8%), with English being second most common ( 0.6%) and Serbo-Croatian being third ( 0.6%).

In the 2007 election the most popular party was the SVP which received 39.8% of the vote.  The next three most popular parties were the SPS (18.3%), the CSP (12.9%) and the Green Party (11.4%).

The age distribution of the population is children and teenagers (0–19 years old) make up 27% of the population, while adults (20–64 years old) make up 63% and seniors (over 64 years old) make up 10%.  In Schleinikon about 84% of the population (between age 25-64) have completed either non-mandatory upper secondary education or additional higher education (either university or a Fachhochschule).  

Schleinikon has an unemployment rate of 0.92%.  , there were 45 people employed in the primary economic sector and about 18 businesses involved in this sector.  24 people are employed in the secondary sector and there are 6 businesses in this sector.  34 people are employed in the tertiary sector, with 13 businesses in this sector.

References

Municipalities of the canton of Zürich